Maryland Route 329 (MD 329) is a state highway in the U.S. state of Maryland.  Known as Royal Oak Road, the state highway runs east-west  through Royal Oak in western Talbot County, connecting with MD 33 at both termini.  MD 329, which formed part of the original road between Easton and Saint Michaels, was constructed as a shell road by the time it was brought under Maryland State Roads Commission maintenance in the mid-1920s.

Route description

MD 329 begins at an intersection with MD 33 (St. Michaels Road) just west of the village of Newcomb.  The two-lane undivided state highway heads south, skirting the southern edge of the community.  MD 329 enters the community of Royal Oak, where the highway passes around a branch of Oak Creek and curves to the east.  The state highway intersects Bellevue Road, which heads south toward Bellevue and that village's dock of the seasonal Oxford–Bellevue Ferry across the Tred Avon River to the town of Oxford.  MD 329 continues east past farmland and scattered residences, heading around the other branch of Oak Creek.  After Hopkins Neck Road, the state highway heads straight northeast through a forested area to its eastern terminus at MD 33.

History
MD 329 follows the path of the original road between Easton and Saint Michaels, which generally followed present-day MD 33 except for dipping south around the head of Oak Creek and passing through Royal Oak.   When MD 33 was constructed in the early 1920s, it paralleled the Baltimore, Chesapeake and Atlantic Railway through Newcomb.  The Maryland State Roads Commission assumed maintenance of the shell road through Royal Oak by 1927.

Junction list

See also

References

External links

MDRoads: MD 329
Maryland Roads - MD 329

329
Maryland Route 329